Jim Willis (13 September 1891 – 14 September 1980) was a former Australian rules footballer who played with Carlton in the Victorian Football League (VFL).

Notes

External links 
		
Jim Willis's profile at Blueseum

1891 births
1980 deaths
Australian rules footballers from Victoria (Australia)
Carlton Football Club players
Brunswick Football Club players